The Lord Vishnu Statue in Biarwa is an ancient statue of Lord Vishnu.

History 
The statue was found under the farm of a former mukhiya Mohammad Latif Rain at Bairwa village of Madhwapur block in Madhubani district of the Indian state of Bihar on 19 March 2021. This statue was placed in a Hindu temple Brahma Baba Sthan in the village.

Statue 
According to Chandraprakash, a technical assistant of Maharajadhiraj Laxmishwar Singh Museum located in Darbhanga, it is an ashtdhatu black figure. Its weight is around 5 quintals. It is 158 cm in length and 69 cm in width. According to archeologist Dr Sushant Kumar of the museum the  statue was made around 13th-14th centuries, possibly in the period between Karnat dynasty and Oiniwar dynasty of Mithila. It seems that the village must be of  Lord Vishnu worshipers during the time of the Karnatak dynasty in Mithila. President Shiv Kumar Mishra of Maharajadhiraj Laxmishwar Singh Museum urged the district administration and the people of the society to keep the idol in the museum in view of the safety of the ancient idol but the people of the village refused to keep the statue in the museum. The villagers assured to build a temple of Lord Vishnu and keep the  ancient Lord Vishnu statue safe in the temple.  In consultation with Dr. Shiv Kumar Mishra, the Madhwapur police station in-charge took written undertaking from the villagers to guarantee the safety of the idol and  informed the Madhubani district administration.

References 

Hindu temples in Bihar
Madhubani district
Sculpture by region
Mithila
Hinduism
Vishnu